José Cleiton Ferreira Júnior  (born 6 April 1986) is a Brazilian footballer who currently plays for Guarany Sporting Club.

References
 Guardian Football

Living people
1986 births
Brazilian footballers
Brazilian expatriate footballers
Veikkausliiga players
Fortaleza Esporte Clube players
Myllykosken Pallo −47 players
Expatriate footballers in Finland
Horizonte Futebol Clube players
Association football forwards
Sportspeople from Fortaleza